The Least mean squares filter solution converges to the Wiener filter solution, assuming that the unknown system is LTI and the noise is stationary. Both filters can be used to identify the impulse response of an unknown system, knowing only the original input signal and the output of the unknown system. By relaxing the error criterion to reduce current sample error instead of minimizing the total error over all of n, the LMS algorithm can be derived from the Wiener filter.

Derivation of the Wiener filter for system identification 

Given a known input signal , the output of an unknown LTI system  can be expressed as:

The model system , using a Wiener filter solution with an order N, can be expressed as:

where  are the filter tap coefficients to be determined.

The error between the model and the unknown system can be expressed as:

The total squared error  can be expressed as:

which is
 
for all 

Substitute the definition of :

Distribute the partial derivative:

Using the definition of discrete cross-correlation:

Rearrange the terms:

 
for all 

This system of N equations with N unknowns can be determined.

Derivation of the LMS algorithm 

By relaxing the infinite sum of the Wiener filter to just the error at time , the LMS algorithm can be derived.

The squared error can be expressed as:

Using the Minimum mean-square error criterion, take the gradient:

Apply chain rule and substitute definition of y[n]

Using gradient descent and a step size :

which becomes, for i = 0, 1, ..., N-1, 

This is the LMS update equation.

See also 

 Wiener filter
 Least mean squares filter

References 
 J.G. Proakis and D.G. Manolakis, Digital Signal Processing: Principles, Algorithms, and Applications, Prentice-Hall, 4th ed., 2007.

Digital signal processing
Filter theory